Dommeldange Castle is located in Dommeldange, the most northerly quarter of Luxembourg City in the Grand Duchy of Luxembourg. Initially a private residence built for the owner of the local iron works, it is now the Embassy of the People's Republic of China.

History

The castle appears to have been built in the 17th century by Thomas Marchant, a forge operator, as a private residence. In 1870, Charles Collart, also a forge operator, lived there. In 1973, the castle was bought by the State of Luxembourg. It now houses the residence and headquarters of the Chinese Embassy.

See also
List of castles in Luxembourg

References

Castles in Luxembourg
Buildings and structures in Luxembourg City
Luxembourg
China